Mohamed Faizal Baharom (born 4 January 1982) is a Malaysian weightlifter. He competed in the men's bantamweight event at the 2004 Summer Olympics.

References

External links
 

1982 births
Living people
Malaysian male weightlifters
Olympic weightlifters of Malaysia
Weightlifters at the 2004 Summer Olympics
Place of birth missing (living people)
Commonwealth Games medallists in weightlifting
Commonwealth Games gold medallists for Malaysia
Commonwealth Games bronze medallists for Malaysia
Weightlifters at the 2002 Commonwealth Games
Weightlifters at the 2006 Commonwealth Games
Weightlifters at the 2014 Commonwealth Games
21st-century Malaysian people
Medallists at the 2006 Commonwealth Games